is a Japanese voice actress affiliated with Sigma Seven. Some of her notable roles include Akira Tachibana in After the Rain, Freezing Astaroth in Combatants Will Be Dispatched!, and Sakura Banka in Build Divide.

Filmography

Television animation
2016
 Taboo Tattoo as Fima
 Lostorage incited WIXOSS as Mama

2017
 Minami Kamakura High School Girls Cycling Club as Shiki Mori
 Blood Blockade Battlefront & Beyond as Janet Barlow

2018
 After the Rain as Akira Tachibana

2019
 Boogiepop and Others as Sawako Nakadai
 A Certain Scientific Accelerator as Hasami Hitokawa / Kato
 Beastars as Els
 Didn't I Say to Make My Abilities Average in the Next Life?! as Princess Morena
 Cautious Hero: The Hero Is Overpowered but Overly Cautious as Hestiaca

2020
 Major 2nd as Chiyo Fujii
 The Misfit of Demon King Academy as Eleonore Bianca

2021
 Horimiya as High school girls, elementary school students
 Wixoss Diva(A)Live as Madoka Maka (Madoka)
 Tropical-Rouge! Pretty Cure as Iori
 Combatants Will Be Dispatched! as Freezing Astaroth
 Muv-Luv Alternative as Marimo Jingūji
 Build Divide as Sakura Banka

2023
 Ningen Fushin: Adventurers Who Don't Believe in Humanity Will Save the World as Tiana
 The Misfit of Demon King Academy 2nd Season as Eleonore Bianca

Original net animation
2022
 Spriggan as Kagaho Sasahara

Video games
2013
 Quiz RPG: The World of Mystic Wiz as Hilde

2019
 Azur Lane as Birmingham 

2020
 Action Taimanin as Asagi Igawa

2021
 Figure Story as Vivian 
 Project Mikhail as Marimo Jingūji
 Gran Saga as Fiona

2022
 Taimanin Gogo! as Asagi Igawa

References

External links
 Official agency profile 
 

Japanese video game actresses
Japanese voice actresses
Living people
Sigma Seven voice actors
Voice actresses from Hokkaido
Year of birth missing (living people)